Together Forever was the Marshall Tucker Band's seventh studio album.  It was produced by Stewart Levine, founder of CHISA records.  This was the band's last album produced for Capricorn Records.  The name of the album reflects the Platonic love of the members towards one another.

The band's follow-up album, their eighth and final album on the Capricorn label, would be a compilation album entitled Greatest Hits

Track listing
All songs written by Toy Caldwell, except where noted.

Side one
"I'll Be Loving You" - 5:31
"Love is a Mystery" - 7:11
"Singing Rhymes" - 3:16

Side two
"Dream Lover"  (Jerry Eubanks, George McCorkle) - 4:38
"Everybody Needs Somebody" (Doug Gray, Jerry Eubanks, George McCorkle) - 4:41
"Change is Gonna Come" (Tommy Caldwell) - 6:29
"Asking Too Much of You" - 6:31

2004 CD reissue bonus track
Bound and Determined (recorded live November 2, 1975 Armadillo World HQ - Austin TX)

Charts
Album

Singles

Personnel
Doug Gray - Lead vocals and percussion
Toy Caldwell - Electric and acoustic guitars, steel guitar, shared lead vocal on "Singing Rhymes", lead vocal on "Asking Too Much of You"
Tommy Caldwell - Bass guitar and background vocals
George McCorkle - Electric and acoustic guitars, banjo
Jerry Eubanks - Flute, alto, baritone and tenor saxophone, background vocals
Paul Riddle - drums

1978 albums
Marshall Tucker Band albums
Albums produced by Stewart Levine
Capricorn Records albums